Ipmil or Ipmilbalolaš means God in the Northern Sami language.

Christians who believe in the Trinity say: Áhči (Father) and Bártni (Son, Jesus Christ) and Bassi Vuoiŋŋa (the Holy Spirit) is Ipmil. 
Ipmil has been used by Sámi Christians for God, the creator and ruler of the universe. There are Sámi Christians who believe in Laestadianism that use Ipmil for God.

Ipmil can also be used when translating God from other cultures. Names of God: Allah (Islam), Adonai (Judaism) could be translated as Ipmil in Northern Sámi. Svenska kyrkan (Church of Sweden) has a prayer in Northern Sámi with Ipmil. Ipmil atte means God grant and is a reply to buorre beaivi (good day).

Sami shamanism
The Sámi thought there were three deities: Radien-attje (superior or celestial deity), Maderakka (the first akka, mother of the tribe, goddess of women and children) and their son Radien-pardne. In Sami mythology, Mátterahkka is said to have created the body of the children who were placed into the wombs. Ipmil could also have been a name to include all good deities.

See also 
 Ipmil - Wiktionary
 Ipmil atte - Wiktionary
 Lars Levi Laestadius
 Sami shamanism

References 

Names of God
Sámi-language terms
Sámi gods